Alexander Grimm (born 6 September 1986 in Augsburg) is a German slalom canoeist who has competed at the international level since 2002.

Grimm won a gold medal in the K1 event at the 2008 Summer Olympics in Beijing.

He also won three gold medals in the K1 team event at the ICF Canoe Slalom World Championships, earning them in 2007, 2010 and 2011. He won a total of eight medals at the European Championships (2 golds, 5 silvers and 1 bronze).

Grimm won the 2009 Adidas Sickline whitewater extreme race, despite having little previous experience of extreme whitewater or indeed of paddling the creekboats used to enhance paddler safety.

His younger sister Michaela has also represented Germany in canoe slalom.

World Cup individual podiums

1 Pan American Championship counting for World Cup points

References

42-83 from Medal Winners ICF updated 2007.pdf?MenuID=Results/1107/0,Medal_winners_since_1936/1510/0 ICF medalists for Olympic and World Championships - Part 2: rest of flatwater (now sprint) and remaining canoeing disciplines: 1936-2007.

External links
 Official website 
 
 
 

1986 births
Canoeists at the 2008 Summer Olympics
German male canoeists
Living people
Olympic canoeists of Germany
Olympic gold medalists for Germany
Sportspeople from Augsburg
Olympic medalists in canoeing
Medalists at the 2008 Summer Olympics
Medalists at the ICF Canoe Slalom World Championships